Christin is a given name.  Notable people with the name include:

Ann-Christin Ahlberg (born 1957), Swedish politician of the Social Democratic Party
Ann-Christin Nykvist (born 1948), Swedish Social Democratic politician
Christin Cooper (born 1959), former alpine ski racer from Ketchum, Idaho
Christin Hagberg (born 1958), Swedish social democratic politician
Christin Hinojosa (born 1976), American actress
Christin Hussong (born 1994), German javelin thrower
Christin Petelski (born 1977), former international breaststroke swimmer from Canada
Christin Piek (born 1889), Belgian tug of war competitor who competed in the 1920 Summer Olympics
Christin Sørum (born 1968), retired Norwegian long-distance runner
Christin Senkel (born 1987), German bobsledder who has competed since 2008
Christin Steuer (born 1983), diver from Germany who won the bronze medal at the 2007 World Aquatics Championships
Christin Wurth-Thomas (born 1980), American athlete, who competes in middle distance track events
Hege Christin Vikebø (born 1978), Norwegian team handball player

See also
Pierre Christin (born 1938), French comics creator and writer
Christen (disambiguation), given name and surname
Kristin (name)
Kristen (given name)